Jane Tattersall is a Canadian sound editor, most noted as a six-time Genie Award and Canadian Screen Award winner for Best Sound Editing.

Born in England, Tattersall moved with her family to Canada in childhood, and was educated at Queen's University. She worked as a researcher for TVOntario documentaries before apprenticing as a sound editor, and formed her own company, Tattersall Sound, in 1992. In 2000 the company merged with Casablanca Sound & Picture, a division of Alliance Atlantis, to form Tattersall Casablanca. She left her position as president of TC in 2003, returning to freelance sound editing work.

Her first Genie win was for Naked Lunch, a film for which she notably had to stick her hand into a jar of cockroaches to achieve the desired hissing sound.

Awards

Genie Awards

Gemini Awards

Canadian Screen Awards

Primetime Emmy Awards

References

External links

Canadian sound editors
Women sound editors
Best Sound Editing Genie and Canadian Screen Award winners
Canadian women in film
Living people
Year of birth missing (living people)